Laurence Holloway  (born 31 March 1938) is an English pianist and composer from Oldham, Lancashire, England. He is perhaps best known as the Musical Director for Michael Parkinson's chat show, firstly on the BBC then ITV. He also was Musical Director for the first three series of Strictly Come Dancing on the BBC.

Biography 
Holloway has appeared with the London Symphony Orchestra, the BBC Concert Orchestra, the Royal Philharmonic, and the Boston Pops Orchestra as both conductor and lead pianist. His TV work has included composing several well-known TV theme tunes such as Wicked Women, Maggie and Her, Blind Date and Beadle's About. He also composed "Hook, Line and Sinker" for the 1970 LWT fishing series Casting Around.

In 1990, Holloway accompanied Queen Elizabeth II and her sister, Princess Margaret, on the piano for a recording the two made of Scottish childhood songs at Buckingham Palace for the 90th birthday of their mother, Queen Elizabeth The Queen Mother. A single cassette was produced featuring a dozen songs, but the recording was lost after the Queen Mother's death.

He has been awarded the Gold Badge of Merit by the British Academy of Composers and Songwriters and he has appeared as the subject of This Is Your Life. He was appointed Member of the Order of the British Empire (MBE) in the 2013 Birthday Honours for services to music.

Holloway married the singer Marion Montgomery in 1965, until her death in 2002. They had a daughter, Abigail (born 1967).

Discography
 Jazz Box Jazz 1957
 About time (Elgin)
 Blue skies & other vistas (Elgin)
 Instant Marriage, 1964 West End musical
 Hit Parade Holloway Style 1966
 Good Time 1967
 The Great Piano Hits Holloway Style 1967
 Piano On The Roof 1967
 Marian In The Morning 1972
 Cumulus 1979
 Brandenburg Boogie
 About Time 1993
 Blue Skies & Other Vistas 1996
 Showtime (Elgin)
 Laurie Holloway Trio: live at Abbey Road 2000 (Grasmere Records)
 Laurie Holloway - The Piano Player 2004 (Universal Records)
 Strictly Come Dancing – Bruce Forsyth & the Laurie Holloway Orchestra 2004 (Sony Records)

References

External links
Laurie Holloway website

1938 births
Living people
People from Oldham
English television composers
English male composers
English pianists
Members of the Order of the British Empire
British male pianists
21st-century pianists
21st-century British male musicians